Me'Lisa Barber is an American sprinter. After graduating from University of South Carolina, she was the 2005 USA Outdoor Champion in the 100 metres and the 2006 World Indoor Champion in the 60 metres. She was also one of the 2003 World Champions in the 4 × 400 metres relay and one of the 2005 World Champions in the 4 × 100 metres relay.

Life and career
Barber grew up in Montclair, New Jersey. Her 4 × 100 metre and 4 × 400 metre high school relays with her twin sister, Miki, at Montclair High School were both honored as All-American. 

Throughout her collegiate career, Barber won four SEC titles. In 2001, while attending the University of South Carolina, she won a gold medal at the World University Games in the 4 × 400 metres relay as part of Team USA. She was made co-captain of the South Carolina Gamecocks women's track and field team in 2002, when the team won at the NCAA Outdoor Championships. During the championships, she ran in place of her sister in the 400 metres due to her sister's injury. Barber graduated from the University of South Carolina in 2002 with a degree in business and retail management. She won a gold medal in the 4 × 400 meters relay as part of Team USA at the 2003 World Championships in Paris, and competed in the 4 × 100 metres relay with Team USA at the 2005 World Championships in Helsinki. During the 2005 USA Outdoor Track and Field Championships, she won gold in the 100 metres and placed fourth in the 200 metres. 

At the 2006 IAAF World Indoor Championships, she won a gold medal in the 60 metres, running the fastest time of that season at 7.01 seconds. Barber left coach Trevor Graham in 2006 following his involvement in the BALCO scandal. In 2009, Barber ruptured her Achilles tendon after a drunk driver rear-ended her car in Atlanta, Georgia, and stopped competing for several years.

Barber runs a line of jewelry called The Honey Collection, a juice company, and a personal training company called Body Code. She and her sister also began doing motivational speaking tours in schools in 2018.

Public image
NJ.com selected Barber as one of Montclair High School's four best athletes of all time.

References

External links
 Me'Lisa Barber, USA T&F
 

1980 births
Living people
People from Livingston, New Jersey
Sportspeople from Essex County, New Jersey
Montclair High School (New Jersey) alumni
People from Montclair, New Jersey
American female sprinters
African-American female track and field athletes
Twin sportspeople
American twins
World Athletics Championships athletes for the United States
World Athletics Championships medalists
World Athletics Indoor Championships winners
Pan American Games track and field athletes for the United States
Pan American Games gold medalists for the United States
Pan American Games medalists in athletics (track and field)
Athletes (track and field) at the 2003 Pan American Games
South Carolina Gamecocks women's track and field athletes
Track and field athletes from New Jersey
Universiade medalists in athletics (track and field)
Universiade gold medalists for the United States
USA Indoor Track and Field Championships winners
USA Outdoor Track and Field Championships winners
World Athletics Championships winners
Medalists at the 2001 Summer Universiade
Medalists at the 2003 Pan American Games
21st-century African-American sportspeople
21st-century African-American women
20th-century African-American people
20th-century African-American women